"Holy Diver" is a song by American heavy metal band Dio. It was released in August 1983 as the lead single from the band's debut album of the same name. Although it only reached number 40 on the Mainstream Rock chart at that time, it is one of Dio's most popular songs today.

Reception 
Following the September 11 attacks, the song was placed on the list of post-9/11 inappropriate titles distributed by Clear Channel.

In 2009, "Holy Diver" placed 43rd on VH1's Top 100 Hard Rock Songs.

Content 
Dio said the lyrics are about a Christ figure on another planet who sacrifices himself to redeem his people.  When the people learn that he intends to leave them to save people on other planets, they selfishly ask him to stay.

"What does Ronnie mean when he writes stuff like 'Holy Diver'?" exclaimed Kiss bassist Gene Simmons. "What is it, a rabbi diving off a cliff? A rabbi with swimming trunks?!"

Music video

The music video for "Holy Diver", directed and edited by Arthur Ellis, features Dio as a hairy barbarian adventuring through a desolate church (the then recently burnt-out St Mark's Church, Silvertown in east London, which is now a music venue). First he strikes a shrouded figure and his hobgoblin friend with his sword, but instead of killing them he turns them into rats. He later visits a blacksmith who is forging a sword. He throws his old sword away and deftly catches the newly forged one. Walking through a corridor, he encounters three seated hooded figures. As the camera pans across them, the third slowly raises its head to reveal eyes resembling those of a cat. The final shots show Dio exiting the church.

Chart positions

Killswitch Engage version

Killswitch Engage covered the song for the compilation High Voltage!: A Brief History of Rock for Kerrang! magazine. The song was later re-released for the special edition of As Daylight Dies. A live version of the song is also featured on the Special Edition of their 2009 album Killswitch Engage, then in 2014, the song was re-released on the compilation album entitled Ronnie James Dio This Is Your Life. This version of the song as well as the original composed by Dio are DLC for the guitar video game Rocksmith 2014.

Music video
The band released a music video for their version. Directed by Brian Thompson, the video features a comical take on Dio's original music video.

Chart positions

Personnel
Killswitch Engage
 Howard Jones – lead vocals
 Adam Dutkiewicz – lead and rhythm guitar, vocals, keyboards
 Joel Stroetzel – rhythm and lead guitar, backing vocals
 Mike D'Antonio – bass guitar
 Justin Foley – drums, percussion

Certifications

References

1983 debut singles
Dio (band) songs
Songs written by Ronnie James Dio
Killswitch Engage songs
1983 songs
Vertigo Records singles
Mercury Records singles
Warner Records singles
Roadrunner Records singles